Youngblood is a Sweden-based boy band made up of 5 members from both Sweden and Norway. Members are Christer Sjølie af Geijerstam, Henric Flodin, Marcus Sjöstrand, Oskar Kongshöj and Simon Johansson. They are signed to the EMI record label.

The band was launched by Swedish singer/composer Fredrik Kempe, and took part in Melodifestivalen 2012 with the song "Youngblood" written by Kempe with David Kreuger and reached Second Chance and faced Sean Banan and failed to qualify to the following round or the Final 10.

Their debut was the single "Blame It on You" by Alexander Kronlund and Quiz & Larossi. They released their debut album Running Home to You immediately after their appearance on Melodifestivalen and release of "Youngblood" their song in the competition.

Following the release of Running Home to You on 7 March 2012, the band embarked on a promotional tour throughout Sweden.

Discography

Albums

Singles

References

External links
Official website

Swedish boy bands
Norwegian boy bands
Musical groups established in 2011
2011 establishments in Sweden
Melodifestivalen contestants of 2012